The point of no return (PNR or PONR) is the point beyond which one must continue on one's current course of action because turning back is dangerous, physically impossible or difficult, or prohibitively expensive. The point of no return can be a calculated point during a continuous action (such as in aviation). A particular irreversible action (such as setting off an explosion or signing a contract) can be a point of no return.

Origins and spread of the expression 
The phrase "point of no return" originated as a technical term in air navigation to refer to the time and/or location during a flight at which the aircraft no longer has enough fuel to return to its originating airfield.  Important decisions may need to be made prior to the point of no return, since it will be unsafe to turn around and fly back if the pilot changes their mind after that point. Otherwise, it may correspond to the aircraft's maximal safe range in a situation where the only possible landing site is the takeoff site, for example in the case of an aircraft attached to an aircraft carrier that is underway and distant from any airfield. In those conditions, an aircraft must always have enough fuel for a return flight, so the "point of no return" may represent the point before which the pilot must return or else risk catastrophe.

It can also mean the instance in which an aircraft taxis down a runway, gaining a certain speed, and must become airborne in lieu of a crash or explosion on the runway (V1 speed)—for example, Charles Lindbergh's takeoff in The Spirit of St. Louis in 1927 in which there was uncertainty about the plane's ability to take off from a 5,000 foot mud soaked runway while fully loaded with aviation fuel.

The first major metaphorical use of the term in popular culture was in the 1947 novel Point of No Return by John P. Marquand. It inspired a 1951 Broadway play of the same name by Paul Osborn. The novel and play concern a pivotal period in the life of a New York City banker. In the course of the story, the character faces two "point of no return" realities: first, that his quest for a big promotion will mean either triumph or a dead end to his career, and second, that he can never go back to the small-town life he abandoned as a young man.

Related expressions
There are a number of phrases with similar or related meaning:

The Point of Safe Return (PSR) is the last point on a route at which it is possible to safely return to the departure airfield with the required fuel reserves still available in the tanks. Continuing past the PSR, the aircraft must either land at its intended destination or divert and land at another nearby airfield should an emergency arise.

"Beyond a certain point there is no return. This point has to be reached."
"Crossing the Rubicon" is a metaphor for deliberately proceeding past a point of no return. The phrase originates with Julius Caesar's seizure of power in the Roman Republic in 49 BC. Roman generals were strictly forbidden from bringing their troops into the home territory of the Republic in Italy. On 10 January, Caesar led his army across the Rubicon River, crossing from the province of Cisalpine Gaul into Italy. After this, if he did not triumph, he would be executed. Therefore, the term "the Rubicon" is used as a synonym to the "point of no return".
"" ("The die is cast"), which is reportedly what Caesar said at the crossing of the Rubicon. This metaphor comes from gambling with dice: once the die or dice have been thrown, all bets are irrevocable, even before the dice have come to rest.

The following expressions also express the idea of a point of no return.

Burn one's bridges. This expression is derived from the idea of burning down a bridge after crossing it during a military campaign, leaving no choice but to continue the march. Figuratively, it means to commit oneself to a particular course of action by making an alternative course impossible. It is most often used in reference to deliberately alienating persons or institutions whose cooperation is required for some action. For instance, "On my last day at my old job, I told my boss what I really think about the company. I guess I burned my bridges."

Burn one's boats. This is a variation of "burning one's bridges", and alludes to certain famous incidents where a commander, having landed in a hostile country, ordered his men to destroy their ships, so that they would have to conquer the country or be killed.
One such incident was in 711 AD, when Muslim forces invaded the Iberian Peninsula. The commander, Tariq bin Ziyad, ordered his ships to be burned.
Another such incident was in 1519 AD, during the Spanish conquest of Mexico. Hernán Cortés, the Spanish commander, scuttled his ships, so that his men would have to conquer or die.
A third such incident occurred after the Bounty mutineers reached Pitcairn Island.
Two similar stratagems were used during the Chu–Han Contention (206–202 BCE); these have led to Chinese idioms, elaborated below.
Another incident is recorded in Burmese history. In the Battle of Naungyo during the Toungoo–Hanthawaddy War in 1538, the Toungoo armies led by Gen. Kyawhtin Nawrahta (later Bayinnaung) faced a superior force of Hanthawaddy Kingdom on the other side of a river. After crossing the river on a pontoon bridge (rafts in another version) Bayinnaung ordered the bridge to be destroyed. This action was taken to spur his troops forward in battle and provide a clear signal that there would be no retreat.
"Break the kettles and sink the boats (破釜沉舟)".  This is an ancient Chinese saying, which refers to Xiang Yu's order at the Battle of Julu (207 BC); by fording a river and destroying all means of re-crossing it, he committed his army to a struggle to the end with the Qin and eventually achieved victory.
 "Fighting a battle with one's back facing a river" (背水一戰). A similar saying from the same period, which originated in Han Xin's order at the Battle of Jingxing (204 BCE).
Fait accompli ("accomplished deed", from the verb "faire", to do), a term of French origin denoting an irreversible deed, a done deal.

 Can't unring a bell, North American English phrase also denoting an irreversible deed. 
 Physiology: PONR may also refer to the moment, when a human male is sufficiently sexually aroused, beyond which ejaculation will inevitably occur.  Recognizing and  maintaining arousal approaching the PONR facilitates enhanced physical endurance and can promote a blissful state.
 Line in the sand - an expression to mean that once a decision is made it is not possible to be reversed.
 Red line (phrase) - an expression to mean that if a certain extreme action is taken, consequences would be incurred.
The arrow has been launched from the bow ("ok yaydan çıktı"). A Turkish expression meaning a path of no return has been taken.

Related concepts 
 Bridge of No Return, a bridge linking North Korea and South Korea which was used for prisoner swaps. Once a prisoner started crossing the bridge, they were not allowed to turn back.
 Failsafe point, the last point at which a nuclear bomber strike can be recalled
 Event horizon, the boundary separating a black hole from the rest of the universe. Anything crossing the event horizon into the black hole cannot ever come back, since nothing can ever cross the event horizon from the other direction.
 Sunk cost, a cost that, once incurred, cannot be recovered
 Window of opportunity, a period of time during which some action can be taken that will achieve a desired outcome

Notes

External links 
Calculate and visualize point of no return (radius of action) - as related to air navigation

Metaphors referring to places